Floribunda (Latin for "many-flowering") is a modern group of garden roses that was developed by crossing hybrid teas with polyantha roses, the latter being derived from crosses between Rosa chinensis and Rosa multiflora (sometimes called R. polyantha). The idea was to create roses that bloomed with the polyantha profusion, but with hybrid tea floral beauty and colour range.

The first polyantha/hybrid tea cross, 'Rødhætte' ('Red Riding Hood'), was introduced by the Danish breeder Dines Poulsen in 1907. It possessed characteristics of both its parent classes, and was initially called a Hybrid Polyantha or Poulsen rose. Poulsen continued this line of work in subsequent years, introducing several Hybrid Polyanthas such as 'Else Poulsen' in 1924. Other breeders also began introducing similar varieties, and in 1930 the name "floribunda" was coined by Dr. J.N. Nicolas, a rose hybridizer for Jackson & Perkins in the US. This term has been used since then to describe cultivars which in their ancestry have crosses between hybrid teas and polyanthas.

Typical floribundas feature stiff shrubs, smaller and bushier than the average hybrid tea but less dense and sprawling than the average polyantha. The flowers are often smaller than hybrid teas but are carried in large sprays, giving a better floral effect in the garden. Floribundas are found in all hybrid tea colours and with the classic hybrid tea-shaped blossom, sometimes differing from hybrid teas only in their cluster-flowering habit. Today they are still used in large bedding schemes in public parks and similar spaces.

Selection of cultivars

See also

 Garden roses

References

Roses